Elk Mountain is a  mountain summit located in the Olympic Mountains, in Clallam County of Washington state. It is set within Olympic National Park and is situated at the eastern end of Hurricane Ridge. Its nearest higher peak is McCartney Peak,  to the south-southwest. Precipitation runoff from the south slope of the mountain drains into tributaries of the Dungeness River, whereas the north slope is drained by tributaries of Morse Creek which thence empties into the Strait of Juan de Fuca.

Climate

Set in the north-central portion of the Olympic Mountains, Elk Mountain is located in the marine west coast climate zone of western North America. Most weather fronts originate in the Pacific Ocean, and travel northeast toward the Olympic Mountains. As fronts approach, they are forced upward by the peaks of the Olympic Range, causing them to drop their moisture in the form of rain or snowfall (Orographic lift). As a result, the Olympics experience high precipitation, especially during the winter months in the form of snowfall. During winter months, weather is usually cloudy, but, due to high pressure systems over the Pacific Ocean that intensify during summer months, there is often little or no cloud cover during the summer. Because of maritime influence, snow tends to be wet and heavy, resulting in avalanche danger.

Geology

The Olympic Mountains are composed of obducted clastic wedge material and oceanic crust, primarily Eocene sandstone, turbidite, and basaltic oceanic crust. The mountains were sculpted during the Pleistocene era by erosion and glaciers advancing and retreating multiple times.

Etymology
Olympic National Park is home to the largest unmanaged herd of Roosevelt elk in the Pacific Northwest. Named after President Theodore Roosevelt, they are North America's largest variety of elk. It is ironic that none are now found in the area of Elk Mountain. As for the mountain's name origin: According to a 1984 field guide:

Gallery

See also

 Olympic Mountains
 Geology of the Pacific Northwest
 Maiden Peak

References

External links
 Weather forecast: Elk Mountain
 
 YouTube: Elk Mountain

Mountains of Washington (state)
Olympic Mountains
Mountains of Clallam County, Washington
Landforms of Olympic National Park
North American 2000 m summits